is a railway station in Nakagawa-ku, Nagoya, Aichi Prefecture, Japan.

Line
Kintetsu Nagoya Line

Layout
The station has 2 side platforms (3-car length) serving a track each on the ground. Station building is located on the Nagoya side of Nagoya-bound platform, and Kuwana-bound platform is connected via the underground passage.

Staff at our station 
The number of passengers per day of the station is as follows.

Year       number of people 

 2015 11 10     4059
 2012 11 13     3795
 2010 11  9      3789
 2008 11 18     4018
 2005 11  8      3728

Adjacent stations

Railway stations in Aichi Prefecture